The bluespotted corydoras, blacksail corydoras, blackspotted corydoras, dotted corydoras, Guiana cat or Guiana corydoras (Corydoras melanistius)  is a tropical freshwater fish belonging to the Corydoradinae sub-family of the family Callichthyidae. It originates in inland waters in South America, and is found in the coastal rivers of French Guiana, Guyana, and Suriname. The specific epithet melanistius means black sail, referring to the dorsal fin.

It feeds on worms, benthic crustaceans, insects, and plant matter. It lays eggs in dense vegetation and adults do not guard the eggs. The female holds 2-4 eggs between her pelvic fins, where the male fertilizes them for about 30 seconds. Only then does the female swim to a suitable spot, where she attaches the very sticky eggs. The pair repeats this process until about 100 eggs have been fertilized and attached.

The bluespotted corydoras is of commercial importance in the aquarium trade industry.

See also 
 List of freshwater aquarium fish species

References

External links 
 Photos at Fishbase
 Species taxonomy and Information

Corydoras
Corydoras, Bluespotted
Corydoras, Bluespotted
Corydoras, Bluespotted
Fish described in 1912